One call can refer to:

One Call, a former American boyband
One-call, another name for utility location
One Call Away (disambiguation)
"One Call Away" (Chingy song), a 2003 song by American rapper Chingy
"One Call Away" (Charlie Puth song), a 2015 song by American singer Charlie Puth
One Call Insurance
One Call Stadium